The 2019–20 EuroCup Basketball season, also known as 7DAYS EuroCup for sponsorship reasons, was the 18th season of Euroleague Basketball's secondary level professional club basketball tournament. It was the 12th season since it was renamed from the ULEB Cup to the EuroCup, and the fourth season under the title sponsorship name of 7DAYS.

On March 12, 2020, Euroleague Basketball temporarily suspended its competitions due to the COVID-19 pandemic. On May 25, 2020, Euroleague Basketball cancelled its competitions due to the COVID-19 pandemic.

Team allocation
A total of 24 teams from 13 countries participated in the 2019–20 EuroCup Basketball.

Distribution by league
The following was the access criteria for this season, based on domestic league standings after playoffs.

Teams
The labels in the parentheses show how each team qualified for the place of its starting round:
1st, 2nd, 3rd, etc.: League position after Playoffs
WC: Wild card

Notes

Round and draw dates
The schedule of the competition was as follows.

Draw
The draw was held on 12 July 2019 at the Mediapro Auditorium in Barcelona.

The 24 teams were drawn into four groups of six, with the restriction that teams from the same league could not be drawn against each other. For the draw, the teams were seeded into six pots, in accordance with the Club Ranking, based on their performance in European competitions during a three-year period and the lowest possible position that any club from that league can occupy in the draw is calculated by adding the results of the worst performing team from each league.

Notes

 Indicates teams with points applying the minimum for the league they play.

The fixtures were decided after the draw, using a computer draw not shown to public, with the following match sequence:

Note: Positions for scheduling do not use the seeding pots, e.g., Team 1 is not necessarily the team from Pot 1 in the draw.

There were scheduling restrictions: for example, teams from the same city in general are not scheduled to play at home on the same round (to avoid them playing at home on the same day or on consecutive days, due to logistics and crowd control).

Regular season

In each group, teams played against each other home-and-away in a round-robin format. The group winners, runners-up, third-placed teams and fourth-placed teams advanced to the Top 16, while the fifth-placed teams and sixth-placed teams were eliminated. The rounds were 1–2 October, 8–9 October, 15–16 October, 22–23 October, 29–30 October, 5–6 November, 12–13 November, 19–20 November, 10–11 December, and 17–18 December 2019.

Group A

Group B

Group C

Group D

Top 16
In each group, teams played against each other home-and-away in a round-robin format. The group winners and runners-up advanced to the Playoffs, while the third-placed teams and fourth-placed teams were eliminated. The rounds were 7–8 January, 14–15 January, 21–22 January, 28–29 January, 4–5 February and 3–5 March 2020.

Group E

Group F

Group G

Group H

Playoffs
It was planned, in the playoffs, teams play against each other must win two games to win the series. Thus, if one team wins two games before all three games have been played, the game that remains is omitted. The team that finished in the higher Top 16 place will play the first and the third (if it is necessary) legs of the series at home. The playoffs involves the eight teams which qualified as winners and runners-up of each of the four groups in the Top 16.

Bracket

Quarterfinals
The first legs were to be played on 17 March, the second legs on 20 March and the third legs on 25 March 2020, if necessary.

|}

Semifinals
The first legs were to be played on 31 March, the second legs on 3 April and the third legs on 8 April 2020, if necessary.

|}

Finals
The first leg were to be played on 21 April, the second leg on 24 April, and the third leg on 27 April 2020, if necessary.

|}

Attendances

Awards
All official awards of the 2019–20 EuroCup Basketball.

Regular Season MVP

Top 16 MVP

MVP of the Round

See also
2019–20 EuroLeague
2019–20 Euroleague Basketball Next Generation Tournament
2019–20 Basketball Champions League
2019–20 FIBA Europe Cup

References

External links
Official website

 
EuroCup Basketball seasons
 
EuroCup